Provincial road N522 is a Dutch provincial road.

See also

References

External links

522
522